The Medusa Effect is an original novel by Justin Richards  featuring the fictional archaeologist Bernice Summerfield. The New Adventures were a spin-off from the long-running British science fiction television series Doctor Who.

1998 British novels
1998 science fiction novels
Virgin New Adventures
Novels by Justin Richards